Khud-Daar is a 1982 Indian Hindi-language action film directed by Ravi Tandon. The music is by Rajesh Roshan and the lyrics by Majrooh Sultanpuri. The film stars Amitabh Bachchan, Sanjeev Kumar, Parveen Babi, Vinod Mehra, Prem Chopra, Mehmood, Bindiya Goswami and Tanuja in pivotal roles. It was remade in Tamil as Padikkadhavan and in Telugu as Driver Babu.

It was released during the week when Amitabh Bachchan was critically injured while shooting for the film Coolie in Bangalore. The movie become the fourth highest-grossing film office 1982.

Plot 

Govind (Amitabh Bachchan) and Rajesh (Vinod Mehra) are two brothers who are happy being brought up by their considerably older stepbrother Hari (Sanjeev Kumar). However, when Hari has to leave home for two months to complete his law degree, his newly married wife Seema (Tanuja), jealous of her husband's excessive affection for the two, illtreats them, forcing them to leave home and escape to Bombay.

After days spent doing menial labour, the two brothers are finally given a home by the widower Rahim (A. K. Hangal), who has a son Anwar and daughter Farida. Govind takes on the responsibility of providing for his brother's education by becoming the taxi-driver Chhotu Ustad. Rajesh, however, is ambitious and foppish, and spurns his brother and the latter's pride by marrying the rich Seth Verma's daughter Manju (Bindiya Goswami) and staying at his father-in-law's mansion.

Verma's brother Bansi (Prem Chopra), who has actually been instrumental in fixing up this marriage, employs the unsuspecting Rajesh to carry on a drug-smuggling trade using the vehicles of the Verma Transport Company, owned by the Seth. One such operation is foiled by the police, and Anwar, also mixed up in his business, is left seriously injured. Bansi's men attempt to kidnap Anwar to destroy evidence when Govind is not at home. In the skirmish that ensues, Rahim is shot fatally.

In the aftermath of the tragedy and Rajesh's realisation of how he has been used by Bansi, Rajesh seeks his brother's mercy. However, at this very moment, Bansi murders Seth Verma and tries to frame Rajesh for it. However, it is Govind who is found at the scene of the crime and accused of murder. The judge at his trial is Hari, who is now one of the leading legal eagles in the city. In the course of the trial, the real identity of the accused and his brother are revealed to Hari. Hari now steps down as judge and becomes Govind's defense attorney. Through a series of astute investigations, he unearths the truth. Bansi, cornered, attempts to shoot Hari and escapes the courtroom, but is finally tracked down by Govind in his beloved taxi 'Basanti'. As the smuggler is arrested, the three brothers are reconciled.

Cast 

 Amitabh Bachchan as Govind Srivastava / Chhotu Ustaad
 Sanjeev Kumar as Hari Srivastava
 Vinod Mehra as Rajesh Srivastava
 Parveen Babi as Mary
 Tanuja as Seema
 Bindiya Goswami as Manju Verma
 Prem Chopra as Bansi
 Mehmood as Jaggan, a banana seller and friend of Govind
 A. K. Hangal as Rahim Chacha
 Ramesh Deo as Ramanathan
 Pinchoo Kapoor as Mr. Verma
 Madhu Malini as Farida, Daughter of Rahim Chacha 
 Mukri as Tailor
 Ali Masood as Anwar, Son of Rahim Chacha
Satyen Kappu as Pascal, Beer Bar Owner
 Yusuf Khan as Peter 
Vikas Anand as Police Inspector 
 Raza Murad as Public Prosecutor Lawyer
 Gajanan Jagirdar as Replaced Judge in place of Hari Srivastava
Moolchand as Small-time Smuggler
Raju Shrestha as Adolscent Govind Srivastava

Production
Anwar Ali had met and became good friends with Amitabh Bachchan during their time working together in Saat Hindustani, Bachchan's debut film. It was this friendship that was responsible for Bachchan landing the lead role in "Bombay to Goa", a 1973 movie that was made by Mehmood, Anwar Ali's elder brother, and in which Ali also starred.

In 1980-81, Ali had fallen into substantial financial difficulties after Mehmood threw Ali out of his house, his production company, and even took away his car keys. A friend of Ali's eldest brother Usman Ali agreed to help him financially if he succeeded in getting a confirmation letter from Amitabh Bachchan for a film.

Gathering his wits, Ali went to meet Amitabh and explained his situation. Amitabh immediately agreed to work for him, even agreeing to foregoing his signing amount. His only condition was that the scriptwriter would be of his choice. Amitabh's first pick were the writing pair of Salim-Javed, who had penned many of Bachchan's superhit films. But the writing duo's price was too high for Ali to afford and so Amitabh approached another of his writer friend, Kader Khan. Khan agreed and after Ravi Tandon was picked as the director, work on Khud-Daar 
began.

The female lead was originally intended to be a Maharashtrian woman, with Rekha being the prime candidate for the role. But things didn't work out and Parveen Babi was signed. With Babi's involvement, the female lead character was changed to a Christian woman. Ali also signed his elder brother Mehmood for a small role in the film, for which Mehmood demanded and was paid his full market price. In contrast, Bachchan, the star of the movie settled for only a fraction of his normal price.

The production first hit a snag when Parveen Babi left the movie halfway after she became a follower of Rajneesh (Osho), a spiritual guru who had an ashram in Pune and who had many followers, including Bollywood star Vinod Khanna.

Later the movie ran into financial trouble, and after Mehmood refused to help Ali with the financing, he resorted to partnering with F.K. Rattonsey who provided the money to complete the film.

During shooting of the song "Mach Gaya Shor", at the insistence of the dance director, Amitabh tried to break the earthen pot (matki) with his head and ended up getting a nasty cut on his forehead which required several stitches.

Release and reception
Khud-Daar was completed and released in 1982, the same year that also saw the release of five other movies starring Bachchan, namely Namak Halaal, Shakti, Satte Pe Satta,Bemisaal and Desh Premee.Khud-Daar however, was released during the month when Amitabh was admitted in Breach Candy Hospital after suffering a life-threatening accident on the sets of Coolie''.

The movie performed extremely well, running to packed houses and becoming one of the highest-grossing movies of that year.

Soundtrack
All the songs were composed by Rajesh Roshan and lyrics were penned by Majrooh Sultanpuri. The song "Maa Ka Pyar" was recorded but did not appear in the finished film. The song "Mach Gaya Shor" was originally recorded in Amitabh's voice, but was later redone with Kishore Kumar helming the vocals

References

External links 
 

1982 films
1980s Hindi-language films
Hindi films remade in other languages
Films scored by Rajesh Roshan
Films directed by Ravi Tandon